Raštani may refer to:
 Raštani, Mostar, Bosnia and Herzegovina
 Raštani, Bitola, North Macedonia
 Raštani, Kičevo, North Macedonia
 Raštani, Veles, North Macedonia